Red Buttes Observatory (RBO) is an astronomical observatory owned and operated by University of Wyoming. The observatory houses a  telescope built by DFM Engineering. There are two instruments available: a 1024x1024 imaging camera, and a near-infrared camera. A second, smaller telescope built by Orion is mounted on the main telescope. Research at the observatory has included monitoring Cepheid variable stars and follow-up observation of gamma-ray bursts.

See also 
 Wyoming Infrared Observatory
 List of astronomical observatories
 Red Buttes, Wyoming

References

External links
 Red Buttes Observatory at the University of Wyoming
 Clear Sky Clock for RBO: forecasts of observing conditions.

Astronomical observatories in Wyoming
Buildings and structures in Albany County, Wyoming
University of Wyoming